The 2016–17 Southern Combination Football League season was the 92nd in the history of the competition, which lies at levels 9 and 10 of the English football league system.

Premier Division

Premier Division featured 17 clubs which competed in the division last season, along with three new clubs:
 Crawley Down Gatwick, promoted from Division One
 Haywards Heath Town, promoted from Division One
 Peacehaven & Telscombe, relegated from the Isthmian League

Also, Wick & Barnham reverted to their original name of Wick.

Haywards Heath Town, Horsham YMCA, Pagham and Shoreham applied for promotion to Step 4 for 2017–18. While Haywards Heath Town won the league, they were subsequently charged by the FA for playing a suspended player. On 22 May, it was announced that Haywards Heath had 9 points deducted, which would hand the title and promotion to Shoreham. Haywards Heath's appeal was ultimately dismissed on 15 June, therefore Shoreham's championship and promotion were confirmed.

League table

Results table

Division One

Division One featured 14 clubs which competed in the division last season, along with four new clubs:
 AFC Varndeanians, promoted from Division Two
 Billingshurst, promoted from Division Two
 East Preston, relegated from the Premier Division
 St Francis Rangers, relegated from the Premier Division

Little Common could not be promoted as arranging a groundshare with another club in order to secure promotion was not allowed. This resulted in a reprieve for AFC Uckfield Town.

League table

Results table

Division Two

Division Two featured twelve clubs which competed in the division last season, along with four new clubs:
Jarvis Brook, promoted from the Mid-Sussex League
Lancing United, promoted from the West Sussex League
Sidlesham, demoted from Division One
Worthing Town Leisure, promoted from the Brighton, Worthing & District League, and a merger between Worthing Town F.C. and Worthing Leisure F.C.

A.F.C. Roffey Club withdrew from the league in August 2016 without playing a match.

Promotion from this division depends on ground grading, and neither Bosham nor Jarvis Brook had the required grading. This resulted in reprieves for AFC Varndeanians and St Francis Rangers from Division One.

References

2016-17
9